Liz Friedlander is an American music video, television director and television producer.

Originally from New York City, Friedlander moved to Pennsylvania to attend the Drama Conservatory school at Carnegie Mellon University. She then moved to Los Angeles where she attended the University of California Santa Cruz followed by the UCLA School of Theater, Film and Television, where she graduated as the valedictorian of her class. She also won the Frank S. Glicksman Award for her short film Eleven-Twenty.

From the mid-1990s to 2009, she has amassed a number of music video credits directing videos for Alanis Morissette, U2, Megadeth, Avril Lavigne, John Mayer, Celine Dion, R.E.M., 3 Doors Down, among other artists. In 2006, she directed her first feature film Take the Lead starring Antonio Banderas. Beginning in 2008, Friedlander moved on to television, directing episodes of One Tree Hill, The Vampire Diaries, Privileged, Pretty Little Liars, 90210, Melrose Place, Outlaw and Gossip Girl.

Music videos

1996
Leah Andreone - "It's Alright, It's OK"
Babyface featuring Mariah Carey & Kenny G - "Every Time I Close My Eyes"
Maxwell - "Ascension (Don't Ever Wonder)"
Alanis Morissette - "You Learn"

1997
Alana Davis - "32 Flavors"
Chantal Kreviazuk - "Surrounded" (Version #2)
Billy Lawrence featuring MC Lyte - "Come On"
Megadeth - "Trust"
Porno for Pyros - "Hard Charger" (credited as Alan Smithee)

1998
G. Love & Special Sauce - "I-76"
Harvey Danger - "Flagpole Sitta"
Steve Poltz - "Silver Lining"
Save Ferris - "The World Is New"

1999
Paula Cole - "I Believe in Love"
Celine Dion - "That's the Way It Is"
Shawn Mullins - "What Is Life?"
R.E.M. - "The Great Beyond"
Janice Robinson - "Nothing I Would Change"
Seal - "Lost My Faith"
Duncan Sheik - "That Says It All"
Taxiride - "Get Set" (Version #1)

2000
blink-182 - "Adam's Song"
Tracy Bonham - "Behind Every Good Woman"
Deftones - "Change (In the House of Flies)"
Dido - "Here with Me" (Version #2)
Celine Dion - "I Want You to Need Me" (Version #2)
Celine Dion - "If Walls Could Talk"
k.d. lang - "Summerfling"
Nine Days - "Absolutely (Story of a Girl)"
3 Doors Down - "Loser"

2001
Anastacia - "Paid My Dues"
Blaque - "Can't Get It Back"
Michelle Branch - "Everywhere"
Natalie Merchant - "Just Can't Last"
Semisonic - "Chemistry" 
Tantric - "Mourning"
3 Doors Down - "Be Like That"
U2 - "Walk On" (US version)
The Wallflowers - "Letters From the Wasteland"

2002
Michelle Branch - "All You Wanted"
Faithless featuring Dido - "One Step Too Far"
Jennifer Love Hewitt - "BareNaked"
Jennifer Love Hewitt - "Can I Go Now"
Meshell Ndegeocello - "Pocketbook"

2003
Kelly Clarkson - "Miss Independent"
Counting Crows featuring Vanessa Carlton - "Big Yellow Taxi"
Avril Lavigne - "Losing Grip"
LeAnn Rimes - "We Can"
Simple Plan - "Perfect"

2004
The Calling - "Our Lives" 
Alanis Morissette - "Eight Easy Steps"
Avril Lavigne - "Don't Tell Me"
Toby Lightman - "Devils and Angels"
Ashlee Simpson - "Shadow"

2005
 Joss Stone - "Right to Be Wrong"

2006
 John Mayer - "Waiting on the World to Change" (Version #1)
 +44 - "When Your Heart Stops Beating"

2007
 Colbie Caillat - "Bubbly"
 Che'Nelle - "I Fell in Love with the DJ"

2008
 Jessica Simpson - "Come On Over"

2009
 Michelle Branch - "Sooner or Later"

Films
 Take the Lead (2006)

Television series
(Partial list)

 Privileged
 One Tree Hill 
 Melrose Place
 90210 
 The Vampire Diaries
 Pretty Little Liars
 Outlaw
 The Secret Circle
 The Following
 Stalker
 Conviction
 The Gifted
 Wisdom of the Crowd
 Jessica Jones
 The Rookie
 Tell Me a Story
 American Horror Story
 The Boys
 The Equalizer
 American Horror Stories
 The Lincoln Lawyer

References

External links

Liz Friedlander at MVDBase.com

American music video directors
American television directors
Carnegie Mellon University College of Fine Arts alumni
Female music video directors
American women television directors
Living people
Artists from New York City
UCLA Film School alumni
University of California, Santa Cruz alumni
Year of birth missing (living people)